Tunstall is a civil parish in Lancaster, Lancashire, England. It contains eight listed buildings that are recorded in the National Heritage List for England.  Of these, one is listed at Grade I, the highest of the three grades, and the others are at Grade II, the lowest grade.  The parish contains the village of Tunstall, and is otherwise rural.  The listed buildings consist of houses, a church, a sundial base, and a milestone.

Key

Buildings

References

Citations

Sources

 

Lists of listed buildings in Lancashire
Buildings and structures in the City of Lancaster